Phyllis Crawford (February 8, 1899 – July 1980) was, during the 1930s and 1940s, an American author of books for children in their early teens.

Born in Little Rock, Arkansas, she graduated from Randolph-Macon Woman's College in 1920 and then from library school at the University of Illinois in 1924 and became an editorial assistant for H.W. Wilson. In 1930, she published her first children's book The Blot: Little City Cat. In 1938, she wrote Hello the Boat! (Holt, 1938), which won the top prize of $3,000 from the Julia Ellsworth Ford Foundation and was a 1939 Newbery Award honoree.

Subsequent books were In England Still (Arrowsmith, 1938), Walking on Gold (Messner, 1940), The Secret Brother (Holt, 1941), Last Semester (Holt, 1942), Second Shift (Holt, 1943) and Let's Go! (Holt, 1946). She also wrote an adult novel, Elsie Dinsmore on the Loose (Cape, 1930).

References
 Current Biography 1940, pp. 203–204
 https://web.archive.org/web/20070609230125/http://www.buriedantiques.com/20th_century_authors/phyllis_crawford.htm

External links

  (mainly under 'Crawford, Phyllis, 1899-' without '1980', previous page of browse report)
 Josie Turner at LC Authorities, no catalog records

1899 births
1980 deaths
American children's writers
Newbery Honor winners
Writers from Little Rock, Arkansas
Date of death missing